Sir David Hechstetter (or Heckstetter, Hetchetter, Hochstetter, or Hockstetter; c. 1659 – 14 June 1721) was a director of the Company of Merchant Adventurers of London (the Hamburg Company) and a land-owner in Hertfordshire and Middlesex. He was a justice of the peace for Middlesex and was knighted in 1714.

Early life
David Hechstetter was born around 1659. His place of birth is unknown. According to John Burke, he changed his name from Hockstetter (see Höchstetter) to Hechstetter and his family were accorded great honour in Germany by Emperor Maximilian of the Holy Roman Empire.

Family
Hechstetter married twice, first to a lady by the name of White, and secondly to a lady named Harrison who was originally from the Duchy of Brunswick. One of his wives was treated by the naturalist and physician Martin Lister when she fell ill and Hechstetter wrote to Lister in 1699 when she recovered.

His son, who succeeded him, was also named David. His younger son was named Christopher and his daughters were Mary and Anne. Mary's son was David Michel (c. 1735 – 1805), the member of Parliament for Lyme Regis in the 1780s.

Career
David Hechstetter was a director of the Company of Merchant Adventurers of London (the Hamburg Company). He was an investor in the Bank, the old East India Company, and the South Sea Company in which he had four votes. In 1704, he acquired land at Dancers Hill in Hertfordshire from Thomas Andrews on which the current Dancers Hill House was built around 1750–60.

He was a justice of the peace for Middlesex and was knighted in 1714. He resided at Minchington Hall in Southgate, Middlesex, as lessee from 1714 and purchased land that was part of the Minchington estate from Sir Nicholas Wolstenholme in 1716.

Death and legacy
Hechstetter died on 14 June 1721. His 1720 will is held by the British National Archives at Kew and left his estate principally to his wife, Dame Mary Hechstetter, and their children, with legacies of £200 to Christchurch Hospital and £300 to his cousin John Lister. He directed that his body be buried in the vault of the chapel of St Arnold's without any "pompous ostentation".

A marble memorial to Hechstetter stood in the nave of the Weld Chapel, Southgate. It was removed to Christ Church, Southgate, when the chapel was demolished in the mid-nineteenth century. It includes Hechstetter's coat of arms.

References 

1721 deaths
English landowners
English merchants
Year of birth uncertain
English knights
Knights Bachelor
English justices of the peace
English people of German descent
1650s births
Date of birth unknown
Place of birth unknown